The Walter Frost House is an historic house at 10 Frost Street in Cambridge, Massachusetts.  The three story wood-frame house was built in 1807, and was originally located on Massachusetts Avenue.  The Federal style house was moved to its present location in 1866 to make way for the North Avenue Congregational Church, which was moved to its site.

The house was listed on the National Register of Historic Places in 1982.

See also
National Register of Historic Places listings in Cambridge, Massachusetts

References

Houses completed in 1807
Houses on the National Register of Historic Places in Cambridge, Massachusetts
Federal architecture in Massachusetts